Batman: The Video Game, is a group of platform games developed by Sunsoft for the Nintendo Entertainment System and Game Boy, loosely based on the 1989 film of the same name. Despite having the same title, each is actually a different game. The NES title is arguably the best known and contains five levels culminating in a final showdown with the Joker in the bell tower of Gotham Cathedral. It was received well despite changes from the movie upon which it was based.

Sunsoft later released Batman: Return of the Joker as a follow-up which is not related to any movie.

NES version

Gameplay

The game has a feature that was unusual in side-scrolling platform games at the time, largely to the NES itself. Unlike Sunsoft's Batman for the Mega Drive/Genesis, which features the grappling hook, Batman has the ability to do a wall jump, which is reminiscent of Ryu Hayabusa's wall scaling in Ninja Gaiden. He is also able to use three projectile weapons: the batarang, batdisk, and batpoon, which are powered by pellet cartridges.

The stages in the game consists of the Gotham City Streets, Axis Chemical Plant, Gotham Sewers, Mysterious Laboratory, and the Gotham Cathedral Belltower. A number of notable DC Comics villains appear as low-level minions in the game, including Deadshot, KGBeast, Maxie Zeus, Heat Wave, Shakedown, and Nightslayer. The bosses in the game are Killer Moth, a device known as the Machine Intelligence System, the Electrocutioner, a machine known as the Dual-Container Alarm, Firebug, and the Joker. The penultimate boss will be skipped in the continued play if the player reached the Joker previously, so the player can directly fight the Joker next time.

Development
While Batman and Batman: The Caped Crusader were not based on a movie, this game was. The prototype version of the game had some significant differences, such as a 1UP icon and entirely different cut-scenes. The game's original last boss was Firebug and there was no Joker boss. Instead, Batman defeats the Joker in the ending cut-scene.
The art and dialogue were changed from the prototype to the final version to better reflect the look and events from the movie.

Reception

The NES version has received positive reviews. Allgame editor Brett Alan Weiss called the game "one of the best superhero games for the NES". The NES version is also considered by many players and reviewers to be one of the most difficult games ever released for the system.

The Game Boy version of the game sold over 500,000 copies by December 1990.

Genesis version

A title for Mega Drive/Genesis was also developed by Sunsoft.  Unlike the NES version, its plot has more similarities to that of the film.

Game Boy version
The Game Boy title holds an aggregate score of 78.75% on GameRankings. It features Batman attacking with a gun and is arguably the least related title to the movie.

PC Engine version
Batman for the PC Engine is an action-puzzle game, developed by Sunsoft and released in 1990 only in Japan. For unknown reasons the game was never released in North America for the TurboGrafx-16.

References

External links

Batman (NES) at GameFAQs

1989 video games
Action video games
Video games based on Batman films
Batman (1989 film series)
Game Boy games
Game Boy-only games
Nintendo Entertainment System games
Nintendo Entertainment System-only games
Platform games
Sunsoft games
Superhero video games
Video games based on films
Video games based on adaptations
Video games developed in Japan
Video games scored by Naoki Kodaka
Video games based on works by Tim Burton
Video games set in the United States